Damjan Trifković (born 22 July 1987) is a former Slovenian footballer who played as a midfielder.

References

External links
Player profile at NZS 

1987 births
Living people
Sportspeople from Slovenj Gradec
Slovenian footballers
Association football midfielders
Slovenian PrvaLiga players
Slovenian Second League players
NK Rudar Velenje players
NK Olimpija Ljubljana (2005) players
Slovenia under-21 international footballers